Double nelson may refer to: 
 A score of 222 runs, or two Nelsons in cricket
 Full nelson in wrestling